Rilling is a surname. Notable people with the surname include:

Harry Rilling, American politician and police chief
Helmuth Rilling (born 1933), German choral conductor and academic teacher